Lake Akdoğan (also called "Lake Hamurpert") is the name of two neighbouring lakes in Turkey. They are both high-altitude lakes located in Varto ilçe (district) of Muş Province.

Bigger lake 
Its surface area is about   The snow from the mountains feeds it, and the excess water pour to İskender creek.

Smaller lake
It feeds the main lake through an underground creek.

Fauna
The main fish of the lake is the common carp. The primary birds living on the lake are ducks, geese, and cranes.

References

Landforms of Muş Province
Akdogan
Important Bird Areas of Turkey